John O'Rourke may refer to:
John O'Rourke (baseball) (1849–1911), baseball player
John O'Rourke (footballer, born 1945) (1945–2016), English footballer
John O'Rourke (politician) (1834–1882), American politician in Wisconsin and Nebraska
John O'Rourke (Gaelic footballer) (born 1992), Irish Gaelic footballer
John H. O'Rourke (1856–1929), Jesuit priest
John O'Rourke, producer of the 1996 film The Pompatus of Love
Jack O'Rourke (1928–2008), Australian rules footballer